Robledo de Torío is a locality and minor local entity located in the municipality of Villaquilambre, in León province, Castile and León, Spain. As of 2020, it has a population of 427.

Geography 
Robledo de Torío is located 10km north-northeast of León, Spain.

References

Populated places in the Province of León